Ljubomir "Ljuba" Popović (14 October 1934 – 12 August 2016) was a Serbian  surrealist painter. He is renowned for his many erotic and unconventionally juxtaposed subject matters.

Biography
Born in Tuzla, Bosnia, Popović studied Fine Arts in Belgrade. During a visit to Paris, he was impressed by the discovery of 1959 exhibition of surrealist art from the Urvater collection. In 1960, he founded the movement "Mediala", to express concepts of desire and fear. Popović arrived in Paris in 1963 and was immediately taken in by French gallerists and surrealists. Living in Paris and supported by the Thessa Herold's gallery, he painted fantastical scenes, full of disturbing and desirable creatures, reminiscent of Dali's work, according to a Mandiargues's review in 1970. Inspired by Renaissance and Baroque painting, as well as his grandfather's exorcisms, Popović's works deal with the demons of a dark pessimism. 

He is the subject of the short documentary film L'amour monstre de tous les temps (1978) by Walerian Borowczyk.

Popović lived in Paris since 1963, occasionally visiting Serbia. In July 2016, whilst at his summer retreat on the Athos peninsula in Greece, he was taken ill and was transferred to a Belgrade hospital. He died on the night between 11 and 12 August 2016.

Notes

References
Article on Ljuba
Painting - St. Sebastien Exhumed
Interview

1934 births
2016 deaths
Artists from Tuzla
Serbs of Bosnia and Herzegovina
Serbian painters
Yugoslav emigrants to France